Henry Carr (November 27, 1941 – May 29, 2015) was an American track and field athlete who won two gold medals at the 1964 Summer Olympics in Tokyo, Japan.

Early life
Born in Montgomery, Alabama, in 1941, Carr moved with his family to Detroit, Michigan when he was young.

Prior to bringing his athletic talents to Arizona State University (ASU), Carr was a state champion sprinter for Northwestern High School in Detroit having posted a 100-yard time of 9.3 seconds.  While competing for the ASU Sun Devils, he won three national titles; along the way setting world records at 220 yards and as a member of the Sun Devil 4 x 440 yard relay team.

Henry Carr won the 1963 NCAA title at 200 meters in 20.5; the same year he ran 20.69 to tie Paul Drayton for the USA title. Twice that season Carr ran world records; a non-ratified 20.4 for 220 yards and, three days later in a college triangular meet, a 20.3 for 220 yards. Henry Carr ran even faster in 1964; setting a world record of 20.2 for 220 yards. He also defeated Drayton into second place to win the national title.

Olympics
It was at the 1964 Olympics where Carr would achieve his greatest fame; Carr won the 200 meters (in an Olympic Record time) and anchored the winning 4 x 400 meter relay team to a world record 3:00.7 (with Ollan Cassell, Mike Larrabee and Ulis Williams).

Carr had a fright in his qualification for the Olympics. He had won the semi-final trials held in New York in July and only had to prove his fitness at the final trials in September in Los Angeles. However, he was well beaten into fourth place in the final there and with only 3 to qualify he could have been eliminated. His earlier win was enough though to convince the selectors that he should go to the Olympics.

Professional football career
Following the Olympics, Carr played American football in the National Football League.  He was drafted in the fourth round of the 1965 NFL Draft by the New York Giants and played three seasons as a safety and cornerback with the Giants. In his last year with them he was hampered by a knee injury.

In 1969, he had a try-out with the Detroit Lions but quit their training camp.

Personal life
After he left the NFL he found difficulty in adjusting and finding work. He found new purpose in 1973 when he became a Jehovah's Witness. In the mid-1970s he was described as living a simple life with his family outside Atlanta, Georgia. In later life, Carr became a Jehovah's Witness elder, and was reported to have done contracting work and owned a restaurant. He died of cancer on May 29, 2015 in Griffin, Georgia.

Accolades and awards
Carr was a 1975 Charter inductee in the Arizona State Sun Devils Athletics Hall of Fame. In 1997, he was inducted into the USA Track and Field Hall of Fame.

World records 
Carr set the following world records during his track career:

 220 y of 20.3 s at Tempe, Arizona on March 23, 1963 in a tri Meet ASU-Utah-USC;
 4×440 y of 3:04.5 at Walnut, California on April 27, 1963 at the Mt. SAC Relays for the ASU;
 220 y of 20.2 s at Tempe, Arizona on April 4, 1964 in a dual meet ASU-SC Striders;
 4 × 400 m of 3:00.7 at Tokyo, Japan on October 21, 1964 in the Olympic final.

Note: he also ran a 20.4 s for 220 y on March 19, 1963 that was never ratified as a world record.

World rankings
Carr was ranked among the best in the US and the world in the 100, 200 and 400 m sprint events in the period 1962-64, according to the votes of the experts of Track and Field News.

References

External links

Henry Carr: Detroit Northwestern High School 1961, Michtrack
Whether at ASU, the Olympics or NFL, Carr could motor. Arizona Daily Star, July 16 2011.

1942 births
2015 deaths
African-American male track and field athletes
African-American players of American football
American football safeties
American male sprinters
Arizona State Sun Devils men's track and field athletes
Athletes (track and field) at the 1964 Summer Olympics
World record setters in athletics (track and field)
Medalists at the 1964 Summer Olympics
New York Giants players
Olympic gold medalists for the United States in track and field
Players of American football from Detroit
Northwestern High School (Michigan) alumni
Track and field athletes from Michigan
Track and field athletes in the National Football League
20th-century African-American sportspeople
21st-century African-American people